Church of St. Elijah in Novi Jankovci is Serbian Orthodox church in eastern Croatia. The church was constructed in 1897 during the time of  Austro-Hungarian Kingdom of Croatia-Slavonia.

It is a church of smaller dimensions compared to majority of other Orthodox churches in the region. It was devastated in 1942 during the existence of quisling Independent State of Croatia and once again in 1991 during the Croatian War of Independence. It was reconstructed as early as 1996 in the period of the United Nations Transitional Administration for Eastern Slavonia, Baranja and Western Sirmium.

See also
List of Serbian Orthodox churches in Croatia

References

Novi Jankovci